Once On A Time is a fairy tale by English writer A. A. Milne.

Written in 1917, Milne's introduction begins "This is an odd book".  Ostensibly a typical fairytale, it tells the story of the war between the kingdoms of Euralia and Barodia and the political shenanigans which take place in Euralia in the king's absence, all supposedly rewritten by Milne from the writings of the fictional historian "Roger Scurvilegs".

Milne created the story to contain believable, three-dimensional characters, rather than the stereotypes which will satisfy children. Hence the book introduces us to a princess who is far from helpless; a prince who, whilst handsome, is also pompous and vain; an enchantment which is almost entirely humorous; a villain who is not entirely villainous and receives no real comeuppance; a good king who is not always good; an evil king who is not always evil, and so on.  The result is a book which children may not enjoy as much as adults.

The book was written by Milne partly for his wife, upon whom the character of the Countess Belvane was partially based.

Plot summary

When the King of Barodia receives a pair of seven-league boots as a birthday present, his habit of flying over the King of Euralia's castle during breakfast provokes a series of incidents which escalate into war.  While the King of Euralia is away, his daughter Hyacinth tries to rule in his stead and counter the machiavellian ambitions of the king's favourite, the Countess Belvane.

Characters
King Merriwig of Euralia:  fat, jolly if occasionally pompous and easily led.  He nevertheless can show great strength of mind, as related in an anecdote in which he outwitted a fairy, mostly by sheer stubbornness.
Princess Hyacinth:  Merriwig's daughter.  Rather more savvy than her father, she is nevertheless at first out of her depth when trying to rule the kingdom in his absence.  Despite this, she grows into the role.
The King of Barodia:  Bombastic, proud and arrogant, and takes inordinate pride in his moustache.
The Countess Belvane:  A difficult character.  Beautiful, proud and haughty, she is inclined to melodramatics and emotional self-indulgence.  Ostensibly the villain of the piece, her motives are complex and subtle.
Lady Wiggs:  Hyacinth's closest friend;  helpful and dreamy.
Lady Woggs:  A palace servant;  well-meaning but terribly dim.
Prince Udo of Araby:  Prince of a neighbouring realm, invited by Hyacinth to help her in her troubles with Belvane.  He turns out to be very little help at all, partly due to suffering an embarrassing enchantment, but mostly due to his personality.
Coronel:  Udo's companion-at-arms and best friend.  Far more laid-back and likeable than the prince.
Roger Scurvilegs: noted historian of Euralia, author of the monumental work Euralia Past and Present.  The narrator gives him credit for the basic facts of the story whilst gently lampooning him for his stuffiness.

Themes and issues

Milne himself resisted characterising the book.  In his foreword to the 1922 edition he wrote of it:

References

External links

 

British fairy tales
1917 books
Novels by A. A. Milne
Hodder & Stoughton books
Novels set in fictional wars